William E. Harper (1 December 1877–1947) was an English footballer who played in the Football League for Leicester Fosse and West Bromwich Albion.

References

1877 births
1947 deaths
English footballers
Association football forwards
English Football League players
West Bromwich Albion F.C. players
Leicester City F.C. players
Stourbridge F.C. players